Anna Johansson may refer to:
Anna Johansson (dancer), Russian ballet dancer
Anna Johansson (politician)
Anna Johansson (ice hockey)
Anna Johansson (swimmer), diver and swimmer commonly known as Greta Johansson

See also
Anna Johansson-Visborg, Swedish trade union leader, women's rights activist and politician 
Annie Johansson, Swedish politician